North East Island is a national park in North Queensland, Australia, 700 km northwest of Brisbane.

See also

 Protected areas of Queensland

National parks of Queensland
Protected areas established in 1936
North Queensland